La taupe et les papillons (The Mole and the Butterflies) is an opera by the French composer Étienne Méhul. It takes the form of a comédie lyrique in one act. The libretto is by Ange-Étienne-Xavier Poisson de La Chabeaussière. Composed in 1797-1798, it was due to be staged at the Théâtre Montansier in 1799 but political censorship meant the opera was never performed.

References

Sources
Elizabeth Bartlet: General introduction to Méhul's operas in her edition of Stratonice (Pendragon Press, 1997)

Operas by Étienne Méhul
French-language operas
Operas
18th-century operas